Zachary Woods (born September 25, 1984) is an American actor, comedian, writer, director and producer. He is best known for his roles as a series regular for three seasons as Gabe Lewis on the NBC sitcom The Office, as Jared Dunn on the HBO comedy series Silicon Valley, as Zach Harper on the USA Network sitcom Playing House, and as Matt Spencer on the HBO comedy show Avenue 5. He also recurred on the HBO series Veep as Ed Webster.

Early life
Woods was born in Trenton, New Jersey. He is Jewish. His father is a psychiatrist who specializes in clinical therapy, and his mother is a nurse practitioner. Woods is a middle child; he has an older brother and younger sister. In 1997 and 1998, he attended summer camp at Interlochen Center for the Arts. He grew up in Yardley, Pennsylvania, and graduated from Pennsbury High School in 2003. He is a graduate of New York University.

Career

Woods started performing improv at the Upright Citizens Brigade Theatre at age 16 and was a part of the improvisational sketch troupe "The Stepfathers", whose members included Bobby Moynihan and Chris Gethard. He has taught improv at Columbia University, Duke University and Lincoln Center. He has appeared in such films as In the Loop and The Other Guys, and appeared in the CollegeHumor skits "Adam and Eve in the Friend Zone" and "The Infinisphere".

He is known for starring as Awkward Boy, the protagonist in the YouTube video series The Most Awkward Boy in the World. In 2010, he appeared as a zombie in a Starburst candy commercial.

Starting in 2010, he portrayed Gabe Lewis on the NBC sitcom The Office. He was promoted to series regular beginning in season 7.

From 2014-2019, he co-starred as Jared on HBO's Silicon Valley. He also appeared on HBO's Veep as Ed Webster.

Beginning in January 2020, he had a role as Matt Spencer, Head of Customer Relations for Avenue 5, a science-fiction comedy TV series created by Armando Iannucci that premiered on HBO in the United States.

Woods had a role in the action comedy Spy (2015), directed by Paul Feig, and appeared in Feig's film Ghostbusters in 2016.

Filmography

Film

Television

Web

References

External links

1984 births
Living people
American male comedians
American male film actors
American male television actors
Jewish American male actors
Jewish American male comedians
21st-century American male actors
People from Yardley, Pennsylvania
Male actors from Pennsylvania
People from Trenton, New Jersey
Upright Citizens Brigade Theater performers
New York University alumni
21st-century American comedians
Pennsbury High School alumni
21st-century American Jews